Józef Daniel Garbień (11 December 1896 — 3 May 1954) was a Polish football striker who played for both Pogoń Lwów and the national team. He was part of the legendary Pogoń forwards, who in the early 1920s were superior to all opponents in the country.

Garbien was born in Łupków (near Sanok). Apart from playing football, he was a physician, a 1924 graduate of Lwów's Jan Kazimierz University.

His career started on Pogoń Stryj. In 1916 he moved to Pogoń Lwów, where remained until 1928 (then, until 1933, he played for Oldboye Lwów, a team of veteran players). With Pogoń, he was multiple champion of Poland (1922, 1923, 1925, 1926); he also played 8 games on the national team. Garbien's nickname "Tank" fully reflected his physique and style of play. He was strong and dynamic, but some sources claim that he could be too selfish on the field. After retirement from playing, in 1933 he moved to Chrzanów, where he was director of the hospital.

A member of Józef Piłsudski's Polish Legions, he fought on the Italian Front in World War I, then was severely wounded in 1919, during the conflict with Ukraine over Lwów. He participated in the Polish September Campaign as an officer of the Polish Army. During the Nazi occupation of Poland he was an active member of the underground, was captured by the Gestapo, and spent several months in the Gestapo's notorious prison on Montelupi Street in Kraków.

After World War II he was captured by the Communists and incarcerated for his alleged anti-Soviet attitude. Released, he settled in Chorzów, where until 1949 he was director of the hospital.  He died in Cieszyn.

References

External links 
 

1896 births
1954 deaths
Polish footballers
Poland international footballers
Pogoń Lwów players
People from Sanok County
Sportspeople from Podkarpackie Voivodeship
Polish Austro-Hungarians
People from the Kingdom of Galicia and Lodomeria
Association football forwards